This is a List of notable Old Gowers', former pupils of University College School. The school opened on 1 November 1830, at 16 Gower Street, which is the origin of the sobriquet "Old Gower".

A
Zak Abel (born 1995), English singer/songwriter, musician
Thomas Adès (OG ?-1988), composer 
The Very Rev. Dr. Hermann Adler (OG 1852–54), Chief Rabbi of the United Kingdom
The Rev. Canon Alfred Ainger (OG 1847–49), Master of the Temple
David Ainsworth, Liberal Member of Parliament for Cumberland 1880–1885 and 1892–1895
Sir John Stirling Ainsworth, 1st Baronet, Liberal Member for Argyllshire 1903–1918
 Moses Angel, according to A Tradition for Freedom founder of The Jewish ChronicleRichard Arnell (OG 1927–35), composer
Sir Eric Ash (OG ?-?), electrical engineer and Rector of Imperial College (1985–93)
Professor William Edward Ayrton (OG 1859–64), physicist

B
The Most Rev. Edward Gilpin Bagshawe (OG 1836–38), Roman Catholic Bishop of Nottingham and later of the titular see of Selucia.
Walter William Rouse Ball (OG ?-?), mathematician and historian, Fellow of Trinity College, Cambridge His bequests founded the Rouse Ball Professor of Mathematics and Rouse Ball Professor of English Law in the University of Cambridge. The Rouse Ball Professor of Mathematics at the University of Oxford is named after him as well.
Sir Roger Bannister (OG 1944–46), runner and neurologist
John Barrett, tennis player and commentator, who represented Britain in the Davis Cup
Lucas Barrett (OG ?-?), English geologist and naturalist
Sir G. C. T. Bartley (OG 1852–59), politician
Tony Bastable (OG 1955–?), television presenter and independent producer
Walter Bayes, painter and art critic,
Robert Anning Bell (OG 1876–78), painter and illustrator
Nicolas Bentley, illustrator
Alan Blaikley (OG 1948–58), songwriter
Dirk Bogarde (OG ?-? Junior Branch only), actor
Sir Chris Bonington (OG 1944–52), mountaineer
Dion Boucicault (OG ?-?), Anglo-Irish author and playwright. Helped to get the first dramatic US copyright law passed in 1856, and was involved in the setting up of the UK royalty system.
Sir Alfred Gibbs Bourne (OG 1872–76), director of the Indian Institute of Science
Edgar Alfred Bowring, literary translator, Liberal Member of Parliament for Exeter 1868–1874
William Hardwick Bradbury (OG 1843-1848) – printer and publisher
Sir Edward Braddon (OG 1843–44), Premier of Tasmania
Major General Sir John Rose Bradford, 1st Baronet (OG 1875–80), president of the Royal College of Physicians
Professor Paul Brand (OG ?-?) orthopaedic surgeon who helped sufferers from leprosy. Emeritus Clinical Professor of Orthopaedics, University of Washington, international president of the Leprosy Mission, Hunterian Professor of the Royal College of Surgeons.
Leslie Bricusse English composer, lyricist, and playwright, most prominently working in musicals and also film theme songs.
Simon Brodkin, Comedian
William Speirs Bruce (OG 1885–1887?), Polar scientist and oceanographer
Sir George Buchanan (OG 1878–85), chief medical officer for England, 1879–1892
Laurence Buckman (OG ?-1972), chairman of the British Medical Association's General Practitioners’ Committee.
Edward Levy-Lawson, 1st Baron Burnham (OG 1847–50), principal proprietor of 'The Daily Telegraph
Sir Edward Henry Busk, vice-chancellor of London University 1905–1907
Ingram Bywater (OG 1853–56), Regius Professor of Greek at Oxford University

C
Gerald Campion, actor, most famous for playing Billy Bunter
G. S. Carr (OG ?-?), mathematician.
Richard D'Oyly Carte, impresario who owned and built the Savoy Hotel and Savoy Theatre
 Bertie Carvel, (OG ?-?), actor and singer
Joseph Chamberlain (OG 1850–52), Colonial Secretary, leader of the Imperialist Liberals and father of Prime Minister Neville Chamberlain
Richard Chamberlain, Member of Parliament for Islington 1885–1892
Sir Arthur Charles (OG 1848–54), Judge of the High Court
André Chevrillon (OG 1876–77), member of the French Academy
Sir William Christie, Astronomer Royal 1881–1910
Sir William Job Collins (OG 1869–76), Member of Parliament, Chairman of London County Council, Surgeon, two term Vice-Chancellor of the University of London (1907-9, 1911–12)
Sir Daniel Cooper (OG 1835–39), first Speaker of the Legislative Assembly of New South Wales
Allan Corduner (OG ?-?), actor, played Sir Arthur Sullivan in the film Topsy-Turvy.
Gordon Corera, broadcast journalist
Baron Cozens-Hardy (OG ?-?), Commander of the Royal Naval Volunteer Reserve in the First World War
Joe Craig, novelist
Sir Frank Crisp (OG 1857–59), lawyer
Charles Crompton, Liberal Member of Parliament for Staffordshire 1885–1886
Sir David Crouch (OG ?-?), Conservative politician
 Eric Crozier, opera producer

D
Paul Dacre, editor of the Daily Mail
William Frend De Morgan (OG 1849–55), artist, potter and novelist
Hugh Dennis (OG 1974–1980), actor and comedian
Nick Denton (OG ?-?), internet businessman
Jonathan Djanogly, Member of Parliament
John Dorian (OG ?-?), surgeon
Sir Henry Doulton (OG 1833–36), inventor and manufacturer of pottery, winner of the Albert Medal
Sir Edwin Durning-Lawrence (OG 1847–52), Professor at University College London who researched the Baconian theory
Joseph Duveen, 1st Baron Duveen of Millbank (OG 1877–80), art dealer and philanthropist

E
Richard Eckersley, deconstructionist graphic designer
Albert James Edmondson, 1st Baron Sandford (OG ?-?), Conservative politician

F
Sir George Faudel-Phillips (OG 1853–55), Lord Mayor of London 1896–97
Horace Field (OG 1876-8), Architect
Anthony Finkelstein (OG 1970-1977), Dean of the UCL Faculty of Engineering Sciences
 Lord Daniel Finkelstein OBE (OG 1973-1980), chief leader writer at The Times
Sir John Ambrose Fleming FRS (OG ?-?), electrical engineer
Sir Walter Morley Fletcher (OG 1886–91), physiologist, Secretary of the Medical Research Council, Senior Tutor of Trinity College, Cambridge
Matt Floyd broadcaster for Sky Sports
Ford Madox Ford (OG 1888–90), novelist, editor
George Forrest (OG ?-?), Wykeham Professor of Logic, University of Oxford, founder member of British Committee for the Reunification of the Parthenon Marbles
Sir Michael Foster (OG 1849–52), physiologist, professor and Member of Parliament
Sir Gregory Foster (OG 1881-4), Vice-Chancellor of the University of London, the first Provost of University College London.
Thomas Fox, cricketer and dermatologist
Percy F. Frankland, chemist
Jonathan Freedland (OG ?-?), newspaper journalist, The Guardian

G
Simon Garfield (OG ?-?), journalist, The Observer, and author
Alex Garland (OG ?- 1987), novelist, writer of The Beach
Samuel Gee, physician and paediatrician
Charles Gifford (OG ?-?), Canadian politician
Paul Gilroy (OG ?-?), author and Giddens Professor, the London School of Economics
David Ginsburg (OG ?-?), Member of Parliament
Oliver Gledhill (OG ?-?), cellist
Paul Gorman (OG 1971–1978), writer
Sir John Grandy (OG ?-?), GCB GCVO KBE DSO KStJ, Marshal of the Royal Air Force, Chief of the Air Staff, 1967 to 1971. Governor of Gibraltar, 1973 to 1978.
Sir Alan Greengross (OG ?-?), Former Conservative Leader on the Greater London Council, Vice-Chair of the Council of University College London
Joseph Gouge Greenwood (OG 1835–37), Principal of Owens College and Vice-Chancellor of Victoria University
Maurice Greiffenhagen RA (OG 1872–76), artist
Raymond Gubbay (OG 1957-62), impresario.
William Court Gully, 1st Viscount Selby, PC, QC, (OG 1848–49), Speaker of the House of Commons
Thom Gunn (OG ?-?), poet
Robert Gunther (OG ?-?), founded the Museum of the History of Science.

H
Sir Francis Seymour Haden (OG ?-?), English etcher, writer and surgeon
Roger Leighton Hall CNZM, QSO, (OG 1952–55), New Zealand playwright.
Professor W.D. Halliburton MD, FRS (OG1872-77), Professor of Physiology, King's College London
Laurence Halsted (OG 1984– ), fencer
Nick Harkaway, novelist and commentator
Numa Edward Hartog (OG 1857–61), First Jewish Senior Wrangler, prominent figure in the movement to remove Jewish disabilities, helped to secure the passing of the Universities Tests Act in 1871
Sir Philip John Hartog KBE, CIE (OG 1874–80), Vice-Chancellor of the University of Dacca
Mark Hatton (OG 1984-91) 2 x Olympic Luge Racer
Count Hayashi Tadasu, Japanese Foreign Minister and Ambassador to the Court of St James
Alexander Hill OBE, MA, MD, MRCS, FRCS (OG 1870–72), Master of Downing College, Cambridge, Vice-Chancellor of the University of Cambridge (1897–99), Principal of Southampton University College 1912-1920
Mayer Hillman (OG ?-?), author and Senior Fellow Emeritus of the Policy Studies Institute
David Hobman CBE, Founder Director of Age Concern.
S. D. Holden (OG ?–), steam locomotive engineer
Frank Holl (OG ?-?), English painter
Tom Hood (OG ?-?), humourist
Ken Howard (OG 1947-1956), songwriter, composer, film director and author.
Geoffrey Howard, English cricketer and cricket administrator.
Dr Tristram Hunt (OG ?-1992), historian and Labour Member of Parliament
Richard Holt Hutton (OG 1835–41), editor of The Spectator
Leonard Huxley LL.D. (OG 1872–77), editor of The Cornhill Magazine

I
Rufus Isaacs, 1st Marquess of Reading (OG 1873–74), Lord Chief Justice, Foreign Secretary (briefly), Leader of the House of Lords, solicitor and attorney general (held separately), Ambassador to the USA, Lord Warden of the Cinque Ports and Viceroy of India.

Keith Usherwood Ingold 
Keith Usherwood Ingold, OC FRS FRSC FRSE is a British chemist.

J
William Stanley Jevons (OG ?-?), logician and economist
Sir David Brynmor Jones, PC, QC, MP (OG 1862–69), writer of parliamentary reports.
Judge Jules (OG ?-?), dance music DJ

K
Ian Katz (OG ?-?), Editor of Newsnight
Paul Kaye (OG 1978-81), Actor, comedian, best known for the renegade character 'Dennis Pennis'
 Alex Kay-Jelski (OG ?-?), journalist, editor of The Athletic
Brian Keith, Court of Appeal judge, Hong Kong; High Court judge, England and Wales
Arthur Edwin Kennelly (OG ?-?), American electrical engineer
Joseph Wilfred Kerman (OG 1937-39), American musicologist
Dairoku Kikuchi (OG ?-?), Japanese mathematician and Minister of Education

L
Martin Lamble (OG ?-?), drummer with Fairport Convention
Edmund Leighton (OG ?-?), artist
Frederic Leighton, 1st Baron Leighton (OG 1839–43), artist and President of the Royal Academy
Cecil Arthur Lewis (OG ?-?), Oscar winner for adapting the screenplay of Pygmalion.
Geoffrey Lewis Lewis (OG ?-?), linguist, Emeritus Professor of Turkish at Oxford University and Emeritus Fellow of St Antony's College
Martin Lewis (OG ?-?), humorist, producer and broadcaster
Nathaniel Lindley, 1st Baron Lindley, PC, (OG 1837–45), Master of the Rolls, Lord of Appeal in Ordinary
Dennis Lloyd, Baron Lloyd of Hampstead QC (OG 1929–31, Chairman of Council 1971–79), Quain Professor of Jurisprudence in the University of London, Chairman of the National Film School 1970–1988

M
Professor D.S. MacColl (OG 1873–76), Keeper of the Wallace Collection.
René MacColl (1905–1971), cricketer and journalist
John Allan McNab (1948-55 ) President, The Chartered Institute of Management Accountants 1995-6
Sir Philip Magnus, MP (circa 1855–60?), educational reformer and Member of Parliament for London University.
Sir Edward Manville M.Inst. E.E., (OG 1874–78), Chairman of the Imperial Council of Commerce
Lord Marshall of Knightsbridge (OG ?-?), former Chairman and Chief Executive of British Airways.
Lieutenant Horace Robert Martineau (OG ?-?), recipient of the Victoria Cross
The Rt. Rev Dr. John Howard Bertram Masterman DD, (OG ?-?),  Suffragan Bishop of Plymouth and author
John Preston Maxwell (OG ?-?), missionary, President of the Chinese Society of Obstetrics and Gynaecology.
David McCallum, actor and musician.
Sir Andrew McFadyean (OG ?-?), senior civil servant, General Secretary to the Reparation Commission 1919, Chairman of S.G. Warburg and Co, Chairman of the Royal Institute of International Affairs
China Miéville (OG ?-?), author
Max Minghella (OG 1999–2004), actor
Sir Ernest William Moir (OG ?-?) - Civil engineer who invented the first medical airlock
John Morley, 1st Viscount Morley of Blackburn, PC, OM, (OG 1853–54), Secretary of State for India
Richard Morrison, (OG 1965-1972), chief culture writer, The Times
The Rev William Stainton Moses (OG ?-?), Christian Spiritualist leader and medium, President of the London Spiritualist Alliance (1884-death).
Rodrigo Moynihan, artist
Alexander Muirhead (OG ?-?), developed the first electrocardiogram, one of the developers of wireless telegraphy

N
Ronald Neame (OG ?-?), British screenwriter and director

O
Tom Oppé (OG ?-?), paediatrician, CBE 1984–

P
 Professor Karl Pearson FRS (OG 1866–73), founder of Department of Applied Statistics of University College London
 Sir Roger Penrose OM FRS, mathematician, Emeritus Rouse Ball Professor of Mathematics University of Oxford, winner of the Nobel Prize for Physics 2020
 Sir Claude Phillips (OG 1856–58), Keeper of the Wallace Collection
 Professor Vivian de Sola Pinto, poet, literary critic and historian
 Richard Bissell Prosser, engineer and inventor

Q
 Professor Peter Quilliam, General Secretary of the British Pharmacology Society (1968–71), Professor of Pharmacology King's College London

R
 Sir Walter Raleigh (OG 1877–79), Professor of English Literature, University of Oxford
 Sir Boverton Redwood, 1st Baronet Boverton (OG 1857–61), chemist and petroleum expert
 Andrew Reid, lawyer, racehorse trainer and Treasurer of the UK Independence Party
 Daniel Roche (2011-2018), actor
 Henry Ling Roth (1855–1925), anthropologist, active in Australia
 Walter Roth, anthropologist, after whom the Walter Roth Museum of Anthropology in Georgetown, Guyana was named
 Edward John Routh RS, mathematician, winner of the Adams Prize in 1877, fellow of the Royal Society, also contributed to Routh–Hurwitz theorem and Routh stability criterion.
 Dick Rubenstein, Major, British Army

S
 The Very Rev Michael Sadgrove (OG 1959–67), Provost, then Dean of Sheffield 1995; Dean of Durham 2003
 Herbert Samuel, 1st Viscount Samuel (OG 1884–88), Leader of the Liberal Party, Home Secretary and High Commissioner for Palestine
 Gordon Samuels AC CVO QC, Governor of New South Wales (1996–2001)
 The Right Reverend David Say, KCVO, DD),  bishop of Rochester (1961–1988)
 Ben Schott (OG 1987–1992), author of Schott's Miscellanies
 Admiral Sir Percy Scott, Bart., KCB. (OG 1865–66), instrumental in developing gunnery and other equipment for the Royal Navy
 Will Self, writer
 Stanley Shaldon, nephrologist
 Sir Arthur Everett Shipley FRS (OG 1877–79), Master of Christ's College, Cambridge 1910–1927, Vice-Chancellor of the University of Cambridge 1917–1919
 Walter Sickert A.RA (OG 1870–71), artist and critic
 Professor Cedric Smith (OG 1932–35), statistician and geneticist
 Kenneth Snowman CBE, Chairman of Wartski
 Richard Solomons, Chief Executive of InterContinental Hotels Group
 Professor Edward Adolf Sonnenschein, Litt. D. (OG 1867–68), philologist, Professor of Classics and Dean of the Faculty of Arts, the University of Birmingham
 Stephen Spender, poet
 Marion Harry Spielmann (OG 1872-66), historian of Punch, editor of The Magazine of Art.
 The Rt. Rev. Edward Steere (OG 1842–44), Bishop of Central Africa
 Frederic George Stephens, art critic and 'Nonartistic' member of the Pre-Raphaelite Brotherhood
 Colonel H.F. Stephens (OG 1877–83), railway engineer and manager
 Lord Wandsworth Sydney Stern, 1st Baron Wandsworth, (OG 1857–58), MP and banker, whose estate founded Lord Wandsworth College
 Greville Stevens, English cricketer, Ashes winner, Wisden Cricketer of the Year in 1918
 Desmond Surfleet, Middlesex cricketer
 Fred Susskind (OG 1902–09), South African test match cricketer
 The Most Rev. Arthur Sweatman (OG 1848–50), Archbishop of Toronto and Primate of all Canada
 Maj.-Gen. Sir Ernest Dunlop Swinton, KBE, CB, DSO (OG 1878–83), assistant secretary (Military), Committee of Imperial Defence and War Cabinet in World War One, later Chichele Professor of Military History, University of Oxford
 David Sylvester, art critic and curator
 James Joseph Sylvester (OG 1828), professor of mathematics at the Royal Military Academy, inaugural professor of mathematics at Johns Hopkins University, Professor at Oxford University

T
 Sir Geoffrey Ingram Taylor OM FRS (OG 1899–1905?), physicist and mathematician
 Gordon Thomson (OG 1893–99), Olympic rower
 Francis Taylor, Liberal MP for Norfolk South 1885–1898
 Matthew Taylor, Liberal Democrat MP (1987–present)
 James Thomas (Australian politician), engineer and politician
 Sir Hamo Thornycroft RA, (OG 1863–68), artist and sculptor
 Captain Norman Todd, airline pilot who captained the first commercial flight of a British Airways Concorde
 Wilfred Trotter MS FRCS (OG 1888–90), pioneer in neurosurgery
 Dr Mark Turin (OG 1981–91), linguistic anthropologist

V
 John William Van Druten (OG 1911–17), playwright.
 Sir Julius Vogel KCM.G, Two-time Prime Minister of New Zealand, (Chairman of Old Boys Dining Society 1877)
 Ed Vulliamy, journalist (The Guardian & The Observer) and author

W
 Dan Wagner, internet entrepreneur
 Sir Francis Walshe, neurologist
 Charles Warton, MP, Attorney general of Western Australia
 Edwin Waterhouse (OG 1855–57), president of the Institute of Chartered Accountants in England & Wales
 Julian Lloyd Webber, cellist
 Sir Arnold Wesker FRSL, dramatist
 Philip Wicksteed, economist and clergyman.
 Professor Robin Wilson, mathematician, Gresham Professor of Geometry
 Ben Winston, television and film producer
 Jonathan Wittenberg, Masorti Rabbi
 Roland De Wolfe, professional poker player.

Y
 Sir Alfred Yarrow, Bart., FRS (OG 1855–58), ship building industrialist and  philanthropist

Z
 Oliver Zangwill Professor of Psychology, University of Cambridge.

See also
:Category:People educated at University College School

References

 
Gowers